Trewern is a small village, community and electoral ward in Montgomeryshire, Powys, Wales.

Etymology
The word Trewern is Welsh, formed from the words "tre" meaning town and "gwern" meaning alder (a tree), thus town of the alder or, more likely, alders.

Location 
It is situated on the A458 road, between the towns of Newtown, Shrewsbury and Welshpool. It has a public bus running to these towns. The Afon Pwll Trewern and Afon Pwll Bychan pass near the village.

Attractions & amenities 
Although only a small village in terms of population, there is a primary school, Ysgol Gynradd Buttington Trewern, with pupils travelling from miles around. Also, the school has a public playing area for children to play at. Trewern also has many other sites, such as an extinct volcano in form of Moel y Golfa, Cefn y Castell and Breidden Hill

Trewern Hall is a half-timbered house in the village dating from the late 16th century. It is Grade II* listed.

Governance
Trewern has a community council representing the views of the community and has ten community councillors.

The Trewern ward elects a county councillor to Powys County Council. Since 1995 it had been represented by an Independent councillor.

References

External links 
Photos of Trewern and surrounding area on geograph

Communities in Powys
Villages in Powys
Wards of Powys